Peter James (14 April 1924 – 17 November 1997) was an English set decorator. He was nominated for two Academy Awards in the category Best Art Direction.

Selected filmography
James was nominated for two Academy Awards for Best Art Direction:
 Young Winston (1972)
 The Man Who Would Be King (1975)

References

External links

1924 births
1997 deaths
English set decorators
Deaths from cancer in England